is a 1982 Japanese jidaigeki film directed by Kōsei Saitō. It is based on Futaro Yamada's novel of the same title.

Cast
 Hiroyuki Sanada as Fuefuki Jotaro
 Noriko Watanabe as Kagaribi
 Mikio Narita as Kashin Koji
 Akira Nakao as Matsunaga Danjo
 Jun Miho as Isaribi
 Seizo Fukumoto as Sensei
 Sonny Chiba as Yagyū Shinzaemon
 Strong Kobayashi as Kongobo

References

External links

1982 films
Samurai films
Jidaigeki films
1980s Japanese-language films
Ninja films
1980s Japanese films